Middelgrundsfortet or Fort Middelgrund, known as Ungdomsøen (The Youth Island) since 2015, is a sea fort located on an artificial island in the Øresund between Copenhagen and Malmö. The fortress is constructed at a point where the seabed is 7 meters below the water surface, and at the northern meeting point of the straits Kongedybet and Hollænderdybet.

History
Christian IX's government constructed the fort between 1890–94 to serve as a part of Copenhagen's coastal fortifications, partly using material excavated from Frihavnen. It is one of three artificial islands that were created to defend the entrance to Copenhagen's harbour. (The other two are Flakfortet and Trekroner Fort.)

Middelgrundsfortet was the largest sea fortress in the world, and is still the largest man-made island without abutment, with an area, including wave breakers, of approximately 70 000 m²; the buildings total approximately 15 000 m². A HAWK battery was placed on the island in the 1950s. The fortress remained an active military installation until 1984; in 2002 it was sold to a private investor.

Facilities
The fort has been used as a hotel, with 200 rooms linked by 2 miles of corridors.
Ferries connect Middelgrundsfortet with Langelinie, Copenhagen.

Ungdomsøen

Two scout organisations, Det Danske Spejderkorps and KFUM-spejderne, bought the island in April 2015 for 20 million kroner (£1.94M) with money donated by the A. P. Møller and Nordea funds. The two Danish scout organisations intend to develop the facility, at a cost of 25 Million euros, as an adventure playground "for the development of children and young people "(not just scouts)" into active, engaged and curious people who take the lead for positive social change", with space for 400 campers.

Ungdomsøen ("The Youth Island") was officially opened in August 2019 by its patron Princess Benedikte.

Cultural references
A view of Middelgrundsfortet from the northwest is seen at 1:07:16 25 in the 1975 Olsen-banden film The Olsen Gang on the Track.

References

External links
 Ungdomsøen website (English)
 Middelgrundsfortet website (archived)

Fortifications of Copenhagen
Artificial islands of Denmark
Sea forts